Tore Svensson (6 December 1927 – 26 April 2002) was a Swedish football goalkeeper who played for Malmö FF. He also represented Team Sweden in the 1950 and 1958 FIFA World Cups in Brazil respectively Sweden. He was also part of Sweden's squad at the 1952 Summer Olympics, but he did not play in any matches.

References

1927 births
2002 deaths
Swedish footballers
Sweden international footballers
Association football goalkeepers
Malmö FF players
1950 FIFA World Cup players
1958 FIFA World Cup players
Footballers at the 1952 Summer Olympics
Olympic footballers of Sweden
Olympic bronze medalists for Sweden
Olympic medalists in football
Medalists at the 1952 Summer Olympics